Lindsey McKeon is an American actress. She is known for her roles as Marah Lewis on Guiding Light and Taylor James on One Tree Hill. She previously starred on Saved by the Bell: The New Class as Katie Peterson from 1996–2000.

Life
In the late 1990s, McKeon was involved with Scott Ashley Sterling (son of Donald Sterling). The day she broke up with Sterling, a fight ensued between him and his friend Philip Scheid, who Sterling thought was trying to steal Mckeon from him, resulting in Scheid being shot by Sterling with a shotgun.

She is married to longtime boyfriend Brant Hively, with the couple having wed in a small intimate outdoor ceremony.

Career

McKeon starred on Saved by the Bell: The New Class, playing Katie Peterson, debuting with the series' fourth season in 1996 and continuing until the series ended in 2000. She joined the CBS daytime soap opera Guiding Light in November 2001, playing the character of Marah Lewis until 2004. In a June 2002 Victoria Advocate article, McKeon said of her character, Marah, "She could definitely make some smarter choices where men are concerned, but couldn't we all?" and "I just hope she's learned as much as I have after going through all of this."

McKeon has appeared as a series regular in Fox's The Opposite Sex and had a recurring role on Boy Meets World. Additional television credits include the lead in Class Warfare, a USA Network movie-of-the-week, and episodes of It's Always Sunny in Philadelphia, Grounded for Life, Maybe It's Me, Special Unit 2, 3rd Rock from the Sun, House, and Odd Man Out.

Most recently, she has made guest appearances on the shows Supernatural and Veronica Mars, and on  One Tree Hill as Taylor James, the sister of Haley James Scott played by fellow Guiding Light alumnus Bethany Joy Galeotti. Her film credits include Shredder and Class Warfare.

Filmography

Film

Television

References

External links
 
 Interview at Sequential Tart

20th-century American actresses
21st-century American actresses
Actresses from Los Angeles
Actresses from New Jersey
American child actresses
American film actresses
American soap opera actresses
American television actresses
Living people
People from Summit, New Jersey
Year of birth missing (living people)